Shib Jadval (also Romanized as Shīb Jadval; also known as Shīb Jūb) is a village in Siyakh Darengun Rural District, in the Central District of Shiraz County, Fars Province, Iran. At the 2006 census, its population was 379, in 73 families.

References 

Populated places in Shiraz County